Kalthurai is a small and evergreen Village in Tamil Nadu, India and falls under village panchayat administrative unit of kottathurai in palani taluk, Dindigul District. Major river called Shanmuga Nadi is running through the village. The Shanmuganadi Dam is built across the Shanmugha Nadi in this village. Kalthurai is one of the best education village in Tamil Nadu.

Village infrastructure
Kalthurai is sub village of Kottathurai Panchayat.
Big water reservoir across shanmuga river it supply's  365 days water supply to all nearest village.
Panchayat administrative office is located in entrance of the village.
Buses available frequently
Nearest Railway station: Palani
Nearest Hospital: Keeranur
Nearest Veterinary hospital: Melkaraipatti

Education
A Primary school up to Standard V.
Even it is a small village but peoples from this village now working in various concerns such as IT, TNEB, TNSTC, Schools, etc..
Many students from this village now  studying Engineering across Tamil Nadu, a girl from this village now studying MBBS in Coimbatore Medical College.

Economy
Economy depends mostly on Agriculture. There are two crops based on duration per year.
Major crops cultivated highly in this village includes
 Sugarcane
 Cotton
 Maize
 Paddy
 Coconut
 Tomato is also grown and considered as a cash crops
 Windmills from various company like as Suzlon, Vestas etc.

Temples
Temples in Kalthurai are the Following:
 Two Ganesh (Vinayagar) Temple.
 Perumal (lord Rama) Temple
 MarriAmman Temple
 Pattatharasi Amman Temple

Bus Transportation
From: Palani towards Dharapuram
 NAH, BSBS, Sripathi, RBS, 23, 19, RSR
 From: Dharapuram towards Palani
 4,3,3A, NAH, BSBS, Sripathi, RBS, RSR

References
To Visit more: Kalthurai blog

Villages in Dindigul district